Hasdal is an underground station on the M11 line of the Istanbul Metro in Eyüp. The station was constructed using the cut and cover method.

The station was opened on 22 January 2023.

It is located on the  highway in the Eyüpsultan district’s Mimar Sinan neighborhood in Istanbul.

Layout

Nearby Points of Interest
Istanbul University Faculty of Medicine (Çapa) Hospital (under construction)
General Directorate of Security

References

Rapid transit stations under construction in Turkey
Railway stations opened in 2022
Istanbul metro stations